"Stereo" is a song by American singer John Legend. It was written by Legend, Tom Craskey, and Devon "Springsteen" Harris for his second album, Once Again (2006), while production was overseen by Harris and co-producer Craskey. The song was released as the album's fourth single on April 27, 2007 in the United States. In the United Kingdom, "Stereo" was issued as a download only single on October 13, 2007. It reached number 17 on the Dutch Top 40 and peaked at number 47 on the Billboard Hot R&B/Hip-Hop Songs.

Music video
The song's music video features Legend driving in a desert, interspersed with animated scenes interpreting the lyrics and Legend performing the song against an orange background. While producing the music video, he met his now-wife Chrissy Teigen.

Track listing

UK Digital download

 "Stereo"
 "Stereo" (live from The Royal Albert Hall)

Personnel
Credits adapted from the liner notes of Once Again.

 Produced by Devo Springsteen
 Co-Produced by Tom Craskey
 Recorded by Anthony "Rocky" Gallo at The Cutting Room and Joshua Sadlier-Brown at Integrated Studios, NYC
 Additional Engineering: Evan Conquest
 Mixed by Tony Maserati at Chung King Studios
 Mix Assistant: Andy Marcinkowski
 Vocals: John Legend
 Bass, Piano, Guitar and Additional Vocals: Tom Craskey
 Additional Guitar: Evan Conquest
 Organ: Chris Rob
 Drums: Swiss Chris

Charts

Weekly charts

Year-end charts

References

External links
 

2007 singles
John Legend songs
GOOD Music singles
Songs written by John Legend
2006 songs